USS Cinchona (AN-12/YN-7) was an Aloe-class net laying ship which was assigned to serve the U.S. Navy during World War II with her protective anti-submarine nets.

Built in Portland, Oregon
Cinchona (YN-7) was launched 2 July 1941 by Commercial Iron Works, Portland, Oregon; sponsored by Mrs. W. Casey; outfitted by Puget Sound Navy Yard; and placed in service 15 August 1941.

World War II service 
Assigned to the 14th Naval District, she arrived at Pearl Harbor 17 October where she took up duty in net repair and replacement, salvage of gear lost or adrift, and maintenance of net and boom defenses.

Under attack at Pearl Harbor
During the Japanese attack on Pearl Harbor, 7 December 1941, Cinchona manned both her machine guns and her 3" gun, and, as the enemy repeatedly strafed her deck, she closed the gaps in the net defenses protecting the dry-docks.

Continuing her salvage operations in the Hawaiian group, Cinchona salvaged district patrol craft YP-108 off Lanai in June 1942, and in August escorted a motor torpedo boat convoy to Midway Islands, where she installed nets around the dock spaces, returning to Pearl Harbor early in September.

She was placed in commission 20 December 1942, her officer-in-charge Lieutenant T. A. Ingham receiving the title commanding officer. She continued local operations at Pearl Harbor, and on 20 January 1944 was redesignated AN-12.

Saipan operations
Cinchona arrived off newly invaded Saipan 16 June 1944. She conducted patrols, assisted LST-84 after an enemy bomb started a fire on board, then inspected the Japanese net line in Tanapag Harbor. She remained at Saipan on salvage and net operations until 18 November when she steamed to Guam and Ulithi to lay cables.

From 7 December 1944 to 30 June 1945 Cinchona conducted net operations, laid moorings, and aided in installing a pipeline at Guam.

Post-war activity
Returning to the States 27 July, she conducted net operations at Long Beach, California, and out of Mare Island Naval Shipyard until 24 August 1946 when she sailed for Astoria, Oregon.

Post-war decommissioning 
Cinchona was placed out of commission in reserve 6 November 1946 at Vancouver, Washington.

Honors and awards 
Cinchona received two battle stars for World War II service. The first was for her performance at Pearl Harbor while under attack by Japanese planes. The second was for her operating under dangerous conditions during the Mariana Islands operation.

References 
  
 NavSource Online: Service Ship Photo Archive - USS Cinchona (AN-12) – ex - USS Cinchona (YN-7) (1942 - 1944) - Cinchona (YN-7) (1941 - 1942)

 

Aloe-class net laying ships
Ships built in Portland, Oregon
1941 ships
World War II net laying ships of the United States
Ships present during the attack on Pearl Harbor